is a Japanese actress from Nagano Prefecture. She voiced the role of Vita in the Magical Girl Lyrical Nanoha series, Jun Sakurada in the Rozen Maiden series, Kurumi Tokisaki in the Date A Live series, Sawako Yamanaka in the K-On! series, and Dejiko in Di Gi Charat.

Filmography

Anime
1999
Di Gi Charat – Dejiko/Di Gi Charat
Pokémon – Charmaine

2000
Mon Colle Knights – Cooking King Pole of Heating, Southern
Daa! Daa! Daa! – Seiya Yaboshi
Muteki Ō Tri-Zenon – Ai Kamui

2001
Sugar: A Little Snow Fairy – Phil
Angel Tales – Nana
Mahoromatic – Chizuko Oe

2002
Gekito! Crush Gear Turbo – Michael Steiner
One Piece - Carol
Lightning Attack Express – K-kun, Suguru Shinagawa
Mahoromatic: Something More Beautiful – Chizuko Oe
Petite Princess Yucie – Student A (ep 8)
Sister Princess: Re Pure – Boy
Galaxy Angel A – Waitress Robo (ep 9)

2003
Mouse – Uta Yukino
Nanaka 6/17 – Magical Domiko
Di Gi Charat Nyo – Di Gi Charat / Dejiko (Chocolat)
Tantei Gakuen Q – Momoko Tachikawa
Shadow Star Narutaru – Shiina Tamai
The Galaxy Railways – Louis Fort Drake

2004
Cromartie High School – Dejiko
This Ugly Yet Beautiful World – Mari Nishino
Bleach – Hashigami, Kanisawa, Michuru Ogawa, Rizu, Tojoin Heita, Waineton, Zabimaru
Rozen Maiden – Jun Sakurada

2005
Pandalian – Kiddo
Elemental Gelade – Serena
Fushigiboshi no Futago Hime – Milky
Ah My Buddha – Western Doll
Akahori Gedō Hour Rabuge – Dedeko
Magical Girl Lyrical Nanoha A's – Vita
Rozen Maiden: Träumend – Jun Sakurada

2006
Amaenaide yo!! Katsu!! – Kazuki Kazusano
Key Princess Story: Eternal Alice Rondo – Moyu Moegihara
Hime-sama Goyojin – Rasse
Ah! My Goddess: Flights of Fancy – Shiho Sakakibara
La Corda D'Oro: primo passo – Young Yunoki Azuma
Galaxy Angel Rune – Dark-ish Suspect (Di Gi Charat/Dejiko) (ep 5), Kamisama (Di Gi Charat/Dejiko) (ep 9), Kuroki
Ginga Tetsudo Monogatari: Eien e no Bunkiten – Louise Fort Drake
Code Geass: Lelouch of the Rebellion – Female student (ep 3), Girl (ep 6)
Fushigiboshi no Futago Hime Gyu! – Athlee
Venus to Mamoru – Emelenzia Beatrix Rudiger
Rozen Maiden: Ouvertüre – Jun Sakurada, Sarah
Di Gi Charat: Winter Garden – Di Gi Charat
The Galaxy Railways: A Letter from the Abandoned Planet – Louise Fort Drake

2007
Les Misérables: Shoujo Cosette – Daniel
Magical Girl Lyrical Nanoha StrikerS – Vita
Sayonara, Zetsubou-Sensei – Matoi Tsunetsuki

2008
Zoku Sayonara Zetsubō Sensei – Matoi Tsunetsuki
Porfy no Nagai Tabi – Morris
Noramimi – Smith
Kurenai – Tamaki Mutō
Antique Bakery – Young Keiichiro Tachibana
Strike Witches – Chris
Negibōzu no Asatarō – Ringo no Orin

2009
Maria Holic – Kanako Miyamae
K-ON! – Sawako Yamanaka
Zan Sayonara Zetsubō Sensei – Matoi Tsunetsuki
Mahoromatic: I'm Home! – Chizuko Oe

2010
Bakugan Battle Brawlers: New Vestroia – Purandon
K-ON!! – Sawako Yamanaka
Digimon Fusion – Spadamon

2011
Freezing – Lewis L. Bridgette
Nichijou – Schoolgirl
Maria†Holic: Alive – Kanako Miyamae
Nura: Rise of the Yokai Clan: Demon Capital – Pato Keikain
Future Diary – Reisuke Hōjō

2012
Humanity Has Declined – Fairy
Koi to Senkyo to Chocolate – Hidaka Shiohama

2013
Date A Live – Kurumi Tokisaki
Valvrave the Liberator – Eri Watari
Rozen Maiden: Zurückspulen – Young Jun Sakurada
Freezing Vibration – Lewis L. Bridgette (Young)
Valvrave the Liberator Season 2 – Eri Watarai

2014
Inari Kon Kon – Kamu-O-Ichi-Hime
Date A Live II – Kurumi Tokisaki
Pripara – Garuru

2015
Magical Girl Lyrical Nanoha ViVid – Vita

2017
Chaos;Child – Mio Kunosato

2018
Fate/Extra Last Encore – Rani VIII

2019
Date A Live III – Kurumi Tokisaki
YU-NO: A Girl Who Chants Love at the Bound of this World – Sayless

2020
Date A Live Fragment: Date A Bullet – Kurumi Tokisaki

2021
Kaginado – Misuzu Kamio

2022
Date A Live IV – Kurumi Tokisaki
Reiwa no Di Gi Charat – Di Gi Charat

Video Games
K-On! Hōkago Live!! (2010) – Sawako Yamanaka
Fate/Extra (2011) – Rani VIII
Tales of Xillia (2011) – Musee
Tales of Xillia 2 (2012) – Musee
Fate/Extra CCC (2013) – Rani VIII
Disorder 6 - Hinako
Super Heroine Chronicle (2014) – Di Gi Charat
Hyper Galaxy Fleet (2015) – Tominaga Kaoru
Sakura Angels (2015) – Hikari
YU-NO: A Girl Who Chants Love at the Bound of this World (2017 Remake) - Sayless
Action Taimanin (2011) - Aina Winchester

References

External links
  
  
 

1977 births
Living people
Japanese stage actresses
Japanese video game actresses
Japanese voice actresses
Voice actresses from Nagano Prefecture
21st-century Japanese actresses